Gammarus hoonsooi is a species in the genus Gammarus in the family Gammaridae, in the order Gammaridea - which belongs to the taxon amphipoda.

The species has not been found in Scandinavia, or in the North Atlantic Ocean.

References 

hoonsooi
Crustaceans described in 1986